The family Scraptiidae is a small group of tenebrionoid beetles sometimes called false flower beetles. There are about 400 species in 30 genera with a world-wide distribution. The adults are found on flowers, sometimes in large numbers, but are also found on foliage. The larvae are typically found under the bark of dead trees. The oldest fossils of the group date to the Eocene.

Genera
Genera include:

Allopoda
Anaspis
Canifa
Cyrtanaspis
Diclidia
Larisia
Nassipa
Naucles
Neoscraptia
Pectotoma
Pentaria
Pseudopentaria
Scraptia
Silaria
Sphingocephalus
Trotomma
Trotommidea

References

 
Tenebrionoidea
Beetle families